The Hambrick Botanical Gardens are botanical gardens located on the grounds of the National Cowboy & Western Heritage Museum, 1700 NE 63rd Street, Oklahoma City, Oklahoma.

There are four gardens on the grounds: the Norma Sutherland Garden with waterfall, ponds, and natural vegetation; the Atherton Garden; the Western States Plaza with flower beds and water feature; and the Hambrick Garden with streams, trees, flower beds, and sculptures including Paint Mare and Filly.

See also
 List of botanical gardens and arboretums in the United States

Botanical gardens in Oklahoma
Protected areas of Oklahoma County, Oklahoma
Tourist attractions in Oklahoma City